Platt Hill State Park is an undeveloped public recreation area occupying  in the town of Winchester, Connecticut. The state park has hiking trails, picnicking sites, and views of the surrounding area.

History 
The park was one of several public recreation areas acquired in the 1950s using funds bequeathed for that purpose by George Dudley Seymour. The park first appeared on state rolls in the 1960 edition of the Connecticut State Register and Manual, where it was reported as having .

References

External links

Platt Hill State Park Connecticut Department of Energy and Environmental Protection

State parks of Connecticut
Parks in Litchfield County, Connecticut
Protected areas established in 1960
Winchester, Connecticut